David Colston is an American politician who served in the Alabama House of Representatives from the 69th district from 2010 to 2014.

References

Living people
Democratic Party members of the Alabama House of Representatives
Year of birth missing (living people)